The 1968 Western North Carolina 500 was a NASCAR Grand National Series event that was held on August 18, 1968, at Asheville-Weaverville Speedway in Weaverville, North Carolina.

Ervin Pruitt would score his best career finish at this event.

Race report
Five hundred laps took place on a paved oval track spanning . The race took three hours and twenty-three minutes to finish. Seven cautions were handed out by NASCAR for ninety laps. David Pearson (with a Holman-Moody owned vehicle) defeated Bobby Isaac (in his Nord Krauskopf-owned vehicle) by more than three laps. Ten thousand and five hundred stock car racing fans attended this live event. Out of twenty-nine American drivers, only nine of them finished the race in a timely manner. Notable names included: J.D. McDuffie, Richard Petty, Elmo Langley, Roy Tyner, and Wendell Scott.

John Sears went over the guard rail and end over end to terminate his night.

The vehicle used by the winner was a 1968 Ford Torino machine homologated for use by the general public but modified to increase both speed and safety. A prize amount of $2,150 ($ when adjusted for inflation) was given out to the winner of the race while last place paid out $150 ($ when adjusted for inflation) for only fifteen laps of work by driver G.C. Spencer. When all the winnings for this racing event are consolidated together, the total prize purse was $13,485 ($ when adjusted for inflation).

The transition to purpose-built racecars began in the early 1960s and occurred gradually over that decade.  Changes made to the sport by the late 1960s brought an end to the "strictly stock" vehicles of the 1950s.

Qualifying

Finishing order
Section reference: 

 David Pearson (No. 17)
 Bobby Isaac (No. 71)
 Neil Castles (No. 06)
 Roy Tyner (No. 9)
 Bill Seifert (No. 45)
 Jabe Thomas (No. 25)
 Ervin Pruett (No. 57)
 Walson Gardener (No. 93)
 Wendell Scott (No. 34)
 Pete Hamilton* (No. 1)
 Paul Dean Holt* (No. 01)
 Bobby Allison* (No. 2)
 Eddie Yarboro* (No. 50)
 George England* (No. 88) 
 Ed Negre* (No. 8)
 Elmo Langley* (No. 64)
 Paul Goldsmith* (No. 99)
 James Hylton* (No. 48)
 Bob Burcham* (No. 08)
 Earl Brooks* (No. 28)
 Clyde Lynn* (No. 20)
 Darel Dieringer* (No. 22)
 Tiny Lund* (No. 76)
 Stan Meserve* (No. 51)
 J.D. McDuffie* (No. 70)
 Richard Petty* (No. 43)
 Wayne Smith* (No. 38)
 John Sears* (No. 4)
 G.C. Spencer* (No. 49)

* Driver failed to finish race

Timeline
Section reference: 
 Start of race: Darel Dieringer began the event with the pole position.
 Lap 3: David Pearson took over the lead from Darel Dieringer.
 Lap 14: Engine issues forced G.C. Spencer out of the race.
 Lap 33: John Sears had problems with his vehicle's engine, forcing him to exit the race.
 Lap 35: Wayne Smith's driveshaft stopped working properly.
 Lap 40: Paul Goldsmith took over the lead from David Pearson.
 Lap 52: A frame came off Richard Petty's vehicle, forcing his exit for safety reasons.
 Lap 56: J.D. McDuffie's engine stopped working properly.
 Lap 64: David Pearson took over the lead from Paul Goldsmith.
 Lap 91: Stan Meserve managed to overheat his vehicle.
 Lap 93: Vibration issues ended up giving Tiny Lund some "bad vibrations," forcing his exit from the track.
 Lap 119: Engine issues forced Darel Dieringer out of the event.
 Lap 129: Paul Goldsmith took over the lead from David Pearson.
 Lap 132: Engine issues forced Clyde Lynn to leave the event sooner than he planned to.
 Lap 136: Earl Brooks had a terminal crash, forcing himself to retire from the race.
 Lap 146: David Pearson took over the lead from Paul Goldsmith.
 Lap 148: Bobby Isaac took over the lead from David Pearson.
 Lap 149: David Pearson took over the lead from Bobby Isaac.
 Finish: David Pearson was officially declared the winner of the event.

References

Western North Carolina 500
Western North Carolina 500
NASCAR races at Asheville-Weaverville Speedway
Western North Carolina 500